Mahmud Al-Nashaf (1906 – 10 November 1979) was an Israeli Arab politician who served as a member of the Knesset for Agriculture and Development between 1959 and 1961.

Biography
Born in Tayibe during the Ottoman era, Al-Nashaf was elected to the town's council on an independent list, and later became the council's chairman. He was elected to the Knesset in 1959 as head of the Agriculture and Development list, but lost his seat in the early elections held two years later, in which the party did not compete.

He died in 1979.

References

External links

1906 births
1979 deaths
Agriculture and Development leaders
Arab members of the Knesset
Arab people in Mandatory Palestine
Arabs in Ottoman Palestine
Mayors of local councils in Israel
Members of the 4th Knesset (1959–1961)
People from Tayibe